Matt Cimber (born Thomas Vitale Ottaviano; 1936) is an American producer, director, writer, and occasional actor in films, television, and theatre. He is known for directing genre films including The Candy Tangerine Man, The Witch Who Came from the Sea, Hundra, and the controversial drama Butterfly. Cimber has been called "an unsung hero of 70s exploitation cinema." He was co-founder and director of the Gorgeous Ladies of Wrestling (GLOW) professional wrestling promotion and syndicated television series. Cimber was also the last husband of actress Jayne Mansfield, directing her on stage and in the film Single Room Furnished (1968), which was released after her death.

Career

Theater
Cimber began his directing career in the early 1960s at the Londonderry Theater Workshop in Vermont, followed by Off-Broadway plays including Young and Beautiful, an adaptation of the short stories of F. Scott Fitzgerald, the U.S. premiere of works by Jean Cocteau (Antigone, Orphee, The Holy Terrors, Intimate Relations), as well as The Little Hut, The Voice of the Turtle, The Ignorants Abroad, and The Moon is Blue. 

In addition, he adapted John Steinbeck's Burning Bright, introducing future Academy Award winner Sandy Dennis to audiences.

Regionally, Cimber's credits include The Country Girl, Send Me No Flowers, Susan Slept Here, and The Tender Trap.

He met his future wife, Jayne Mansfield, while directing a 1964 revival of William Inge's Bus Stop, and would direct and occasionally co-star with her in The Rabbit Habit and Champagne Complex. Another of Cimber's Off-Broadway credits, Walk-Up, would be adapted as a film vehicle for Mansfield, Single Room Furnished.

Film
Cimber made his cinematic directorial debut (credited as "Matteo Ottaviano") with Single Room Furnished (1966). The film was noted for its cinematography by László Kovács, a pioneer of the "American New Wave" films of the 1970s, an introduction by Walter Winchell, and Mansfield "in some surprisingly moving moments" in what would be her last principal role onscreen.

Cimber proceeded to direct a string of "sexploitation films" under the pseudonyms "Gary Harper" and "Rinehart Segway," including Man and Wife (1969), Sex and Astrology (1971), and The Sensually Liberated Female (1970), which was based on a best-selling book, The Sensuous Woman by Joan Garrity.

Cimber helmed three "Blaxploitation films" of the mid-70s: The Black Six (1973), Lady Cocoa (1975) starring Lola Falana, and The Candy Tangerine Man (1975), the last of which Samuel L. Jackson and Quentin Tarantino have cited among their favorite films.

In 1976, Cimber ventured into psychological thrillers with The Witch Who Came from the Sea, starring Millie Perkins and Lonny Chapman, with cinematography by Oscar nominee Dean Cundey. Vice Magazine cited it "One of the Top 10 Greatest Banned Films" and "a bit of a masterpiece" and review aggregator Rotten Tomatoes voted it one of "90 Best '70s Horror Films."

Cimber's next film, A Time to Die, was a World War II thriller based on a novel by The Godfather's Mario Puzo starring Rod Taylor and Rex Harrison is his final screen performance. The film was shot in 1979 and released in 1982.

In 1982, Cimber teamed with Pia Zadora on the "handsomely produced and swiftly directed" caper film Fake-Out, which premiered at the Cannes Film Festival and also starred Telly Savalas and Desi Arnaz, Jr., and the crime drama Butterfly, featuring Orson Welles and Stacy Keach, based on the novel The Butterfly by James M. Cain. Welles and composer Ennio Moriccone were nominated for Golden Globe Awards, as was Zadora, who won the Golden Globe Award for Best Female Newcomer for her performance. This was followed by allegations that the award had been "bought" by her husband, Meshulam Riklis.

The following year, Cimber collaborated with actress Laurene Landon on the adventure films Hundra, which also premiered at Cannes and featured a score by Ennio Moriccone, and Yellow Hair and the Fortress of Gold.

Television
In 1986, Cimber co-created GLOW: Gorgeous Ladies of Wrestling, and served as executive producer and director of the syndicated television program. The show lasted for four seasons. It later inspired the fictionalized Netflix series GLOW. On that series, the character played by Marc Maron is inspired by Cimber.

Later career 
Cimber wrote and directed the documentaries An American Icon: Coca-Cola, The Early Years (1997) and The History of United Nations (1996). He created and wrote the eight-minute intro for visitors to the United Nations, for which he received a special commendation from the U.N.

After a 20-year absence from feature films, he wrote and directed Miriam (2006), based on the real-life story of Holocaust survivor Miriam Schafer. According to reviews, Ariana Savalas as Schafer offered "a powerful performance" in "a forgotten piece of history worth recounting.".

Personal life

Cimber married Jayne Mansfield in 1964 and managed her career during their marriage. They had one son, Antonio ("Tony", b. 1965) and divorced in 1966.

Awards and nominations
Cimber's Butterfly was nominated for three Golden Raspberry Awards; Worst Picture, Worst Director, and Worst Screenplay.

Filmography

References

External links

Matt Cimber and Kliph Nesteroff – Behind the Scenes of Candy Tangerine Man

1936 births
Living people
American film directors
American people of Italian descent
Jayne Mansfield
Place of birth missing (living people)
20th-century American male actors